Cogniauxia is a genus of flowering plants belonging to the family Cucurbitaceae.

Its native range is Western Central Tropical Africa to Angola.

Species:

Cogniauxia podolaena 
Cogniauxia trilobata

References

Cucurbitaceae
Cucurbitaceae genera